Hotel Thompson may refer to:

Hotel Thompson (Arab, Alabama), formerly listed on the National Register of Historic Places in Marshall County, Alabama
Hotel Thompson (Worthington, Minnesota), listed on the National Register of Historic Places in Nobles County, Minnesota
 Dr. Thompson's Hotel, the Hotel Atlanta, in antebellum Atlanta, Georgia